The 2020–21 Houston Cougars men's basketball team represented the University of Houston during the 2020–21 NCAA Division I men's basketball season. The Cougars were led by seventh-year head coach Kelvin Sampson as members of the American Athletic Conference. It was the third season that the team played its home games at the Fertitta Center.  They won their first ever AAC tournament to clinch an auto-bid to the NCAA tournament, where they were selected as a #2 seed in the Midwest Region.  The team advanced to the Final Four for the first time since 1984. They eventually lost to Baylor in the Final Four who went on to become the national champions that season.

Previous season
Houston finished the 2019–20 regular season 23–8, 13–5 in AAC play, finishing tied for first place and winning a share of the regular season title.  They entered as the No. 2 seed in the AAC tournament, which was ultimately cancelled due to the COVID-19 pandemic.

Offseason

Departures

Incoming Transfers

2020 recruiting class

Houston also added preferred walk-on Ryan Elvin, a 6'0" point guard from Cedar Ridge High School in Round Rock, Texas.

2021 Recruiting class

Preseason

AAC preseason media poll

On October 28, The American released the preseason Poll and other preseason awards

Preseason Awards
 AAC Preseason Player of the Year - Caleb Mills
 All-AAC First Team - Caleb Mills

Roster

May 27, 2020 – Fabian White Jr. suffered a torn ACL, leading him to sit out before returning for the February 18th game.
January 5, 2021 – Caleb Mills entered the transfer portal. Mills would eventually transfer to Florida State.

Schedule and results

COVID-19 impact

Due to the ongoing COVID-19 pandemic, the Cougars' schedule is subject to change, including the cancellation or postponement of individual games, the cancellation of the entire season, or games played either with minimal fans or without fans in attendance and just essential personnel.

The Cougars began a home-and-home series with LSU and Alabama beginning in the 2020–2021.  Both were eventually postponed due to the pandemic. 
Houston added a game vs. Our Lady of the Lake on February 6.
The game @ Cincinnati originally scheduled for February 21 was moved to Houston.
Houston added a game vs. Western Kentucky on February 25.
The game @ Memphis originally scheduled for March 7 was moved to Houston, after COVID-related issues with Memphis forced the first scheduled matchup between the teams scheduled for February 14 to be postponed.

Schedule

|-
!colspan=12 style=| Regular season

|-
!colspan=12 style=| AAC Tournament
|-

|-
!colspan=9 style=| NCAA tournament
|-

Rankings

*AP does not release post-NCAA Tournament rankings^Coaches did not release a Week 1 poll

Awards and honors

All-American
Quentin Grimes – AP (3rd), USBWA (3rd), NABC (3rd), SN (3rd)

American Athletic Conference honors

All-AAC Awards
Player of the Year: Quentin Grimes
Defensive Player of the Year: DeJon Jarreau 
Most Improved Player: Justin Gorham

All-AAC First Team
Quentin Grimes

All-AAC Second Team
DeJon Jarreau
Justin Gorham
Marcus Sasser

Source

References

Houston
Houston Cougars men's basketball seasons
Houston
Houston
Houston
NCAA Division I men's basketball tournament Final Four seasons